Tutuba  is an Oceanic language spoken in Vanuatu on the southeast tip of Espiritu Santo Island and on Tutuba Island offshore.

References

Espiritu Santo languages
Languages of Vanuatu
Definitely endangered languages